Charles Edwin Smith (April 20, 1880 – January 3, 1929) was a pitcher in Major League Baseball who played from  through  for the Cleveland Bronchos (1902), Washington Senators (1906–1909), Boston Red Sox (1909–1911) and Chicago Cubs (1911–1914). He was born in Cleveland, Ohio. His older brother, Fred Smith, was an infielder in the majors.

Smith always was a bad-luck pitcher either due to injury or playing on a bad baseball team. He had a promising debut for Cleveland on August 6, 1902, defeating future Hall of Famer Rube Waddell and the Philadelphia Athletics, 5–4, at League Park. Then, working with two days' rest, he shut out the Baltimore Orioles, 7–0, ending his rookie season with a 2–1 record in three starts.

He spent three years in the minors before joining the Senators in 1906. In three seasons for Washington, he posted ERAs of 2.91, 2.61 and 2.41, but finished with negative records of 9–16, 10–20 and 6–12. In 1909 he went 6–12 with a 3.27 ERA for Washington, before being traded to the Red Sox for Doc Gessler late in the season. In three starts for Boston he went 3–0 with a 2.16 ERA, and resurfaced in 1910 going 11–6 with a 2.30 ERA. While pitching for the Cubs, he led the National League with six relief wins in 1912.

In a 10-year career, Smith posted a 66–87 record with a 2.81 ERA in 212 appearances, including 148 starts, 87 complete games, 10 shutouts, three saves, and  innings of work. A fine control pitcher, he collected a 1.62 strikeout-to-walk ratio (570-to-353).

Smith died at the age of 48 in Wickliffe, Ohio.

External links
Baseball Reference
Retrosheet
1902 Cleveland Bronchos season

Boston Red Sox players
Chicago Cubs players
Cleveland Bronchos players
Washington Senators (1901–1960) players
Major League Baseball pitchers
Baseball players from Cleveland
1880 births
1929 deaths
Minor league baseball managers
New Orleans Pelicans (baseball) players
Atlanta Crackers players
San Francisco Seals (baseball) players